Per-Olof Verner Olsson (10 December 1918 – 12 October 1982) was a Swedish swimmer who competed in the 1948 Summer Olympics. He finished fourth in the 4 × 200 m relay and sixth in the 100 m freestyle. He won two medals in these events at the 1947 European Aquatics Championships.

References

1918 births
1982 deaths
Swedish male freestyle swimmers
Swedish male backstroke swimmers
Olympic swimmers of Sweden
Swimmers at the 1948 Summer Olympics
European Aquatics Championships medalists in swimming
Swimmers from Stockholm
20th-century Swedish people